This section of the list of rampage killers contains those cases where at least half of the victims were relatives of the perpetrator or the perpetrator's spouse. Cases with more than one offender are not included.

A rampage killer has been defined as follows:

This list should contain every case with at least one of the following features:
 Rampage killings with 6 or more dead 
 In all cases the perpetrator is not counted among those killed or injured.

All abbreviations used in the table are explained below. 



Rampage killers

Abbreviations and footnotes
* – Marks cases where all the victims were relatives of the perpetrator

W – A basic description of the weapons used in the murders
F – Firearms and other ranged weapons, especially rifles and handguns, but also bows and crossbows, grenade launchers, flamethrowers, or slingshots
M – Melee weapons, like knives, swords, spears, machetes, axes, clubs, rods, stones, or bare hands
O – Any other weapons, such as bombs, hand grenades, Molotov cocktails, poison and poisonous gas, as well as vehicle and arson attacks
A – indicates that an arson attack was the only other weapon used
V – indicates that a vehicle was the only other weapon used
E – indicates that explosives of any sort were the only other weapon used
P – indicates that an anaesthetising or deadly substance of any kind was the only other weapon used (includes poisonous gas)

References

Familicides
familicide oceania